Derek Murphy may refer to:

 Derek Murphy (musician), American drummer and session musician
 Sadat X (Derek Murphy, born 1968), American rapper
 Derek Murphy (blogger), blogger and journalist